Walters Dam is a hydroelectric dam in Haywood County of western North Carolina, in the Great Smoky Mountains.

The brick powerplant actually stands  from the dam.

The Walters Dam was started in 1927 and was completed in 1930.  The project was started by Carolina Power & Light and was completed by its affiliate Phoenix Electric Co.  The Carolina Power and Light Company established the community of Waterville at the mountain's northern base, near the confluence of Big Creek and the Pigeon River. Waterville provided the labor force needed to operate the company's Walters Plant, which housed the powerhouse for the Waterville Lake reservoir further upstream.

The dam is now owned and operated by Duke Energy as an active hydroelectric facility, with a rated capacity of 112 MW. It was designated as a North Carolina Historic Civil Engineering Landmark in 1980.

References

External links 
 flick photo of Walters Dam

Dams on the French Broad River
Buildings and structures in Haywood County, North Carolina
Dams in North Carolina
Reservoirs in North Carolina
Duke Energy dams
Dams completed in 1930
1930 establishments in North Carolina